Macquarie may refer to:

People
 Lachlan Macquarie, Governor of the British colony of New South Wales from 1810 to 1821.
 Elizabeth Macquarie  Campbell, Lachlan Macquarie's second wife

Locations
 Division of Macquarie, an electoral district in the Australian House of Representatives in New South Wales
 Lake Macquarie (New South Wales), a lake in New South Wales, Australia
 City of Lake Macquarie, a local government area surrounding Lake Macquarie
 Macquarie, Australian Capital Territory, a suburb of Canberra, Australia
 Macquarie County, one of the 141 Cadastral divisions of New South Wales, Australia
 Macquarie Fields, New South Wales, a suburb of Sydney, Australia
 Macquarie Island, in the Southern Ocean
 Macquarie Park, New South Wales, a suburb of Sydney, Australia
 Macquarie Centre, a regional sized shopping centre located in Macquarie Park
 Macquarie River, an inland river in New South Wales, Australia
 Macquarie Marshes Nature Reserve
 Macquarie Street, Sydney, a street in Sydney, Australia
 Macquarie Heads, Tasmania, a locality
 Port Macquarie, a city in Macquarie County, New South Wales, Australia

Businesses
 Macquarie Group, an Australian company, composed of diversified financial services
 Macquarie Media, an Australian company operating radio stations nationally
 Macquarie Telecom Group, an Australian telecommunications company, specialising in voice, data, mobile and hosting services for commercial and government business
 Macquarie University, a university in Sydney, Australia
 Macquarie Graduate School of Management
 Macquarie University Hospital

Other uses
 Macquarie Lighthouse, a lighthouse in the suburb of Vaucluse, New South Wales, Australia
 Macquarie Dictionary, a dictionary of Australian English

See also
MacQuarrie